Loutre Township is one of eight townships in Audrain County, Missouri, United States. As of the 2010 census, its population was 824.

Loutre Township was established in 1837, and was named after a creek of the same name within its borders.

Geography
It contains two cemeteries: Martinsburg and Unity.

References

 USGS Geographic Names Information System (GNIS)

External links
 US-Counties.com
 City-Data.com

Townships in Audrain County, Missouri
Townships in Missouri